Herluf is a masculine given name which is common in Scandinavian countries. People with the name include:

People
Herluf Andersen (1931–2013), Danish archer
Herluf Bidstrup (1912–1988), Danish painter, cartoonist and illustrator
Herluf Christensen (1924–1970), Danish athlete
Herluf Nygaard (1916–2001), Norwegian military officer
Herluf Stenholt Clausen (1921–2002), Danish ichthyologist
Herluf Trolle (1516–1565), Danish admiral
Herluf Winge (1857–1923), Danish zoologist
Herluf Zahle (1873–1941), Danish barrister and diplomat

Fictional characters
Herluf C, one of the main characters in the Danish movie Dark Horse (2005 film)

Danish masculine given names